Medieval Irish historical tradition held that Ireland had a High King (Ard Rí) based at Tara since ancient times, and compilations like the 11th-century Lebor Gabála Érenn, followed by Early Modern works like the Annals of the Four Masters and Foras Feasa ar Éirinn, purported to trace the line of High Kings. John T. Koch explains: "Although the kingship of Tara was a special kingship whose occupants had aspirations towards supremacy among the kings of Ireland, in political terms it is unlikely that any king had sufficient authority to dominate the whole island before the 9th century". Máel Sechnaill I is often considered the first historical High King, although he faced some opposition. Applying the title to earlier kings is considered anachronistic, while kings from before the 5th century are generally considered legendary. The traditional list of High Kings is thus a mixture of historical facts and legend.

The annals describe some later High Kings as rígh Érenn co fressabra ("Kings of Ireland with opposition"), which is a reference to the instability of the kingship of Tara from the death of Máel Sechnaill mac Domnaill in 1022. He had been overthrown by Brian Boru in 1002, and restored in 1014 following Brian's death, but Brian's example was followed by many other dynasties in the century following 1022. The High Kingship was effectively ended in the 1170s after the Anglo-Norman invasion, its last holder being Ruaidrí Ua Conchobair.

Legendary kings

Kings in the Baile Chuind
The earliest-surviving list appears in the Baile Chuind (The Ecstasy of Conn), a late-7th-century poem in which Conn of the Hundred Battles experiences a vision of the kings who will succeed him. Many of these kings appear to correspond with the kings of later traditions, although the order is different, and some of the kings cannot be identified. The last four kings following Snechta Fína (Fínsnechta Fledach) do not correspond with any of the kings in later lists. The poem is therefore presumed to have been written during his time, and the kings who follow him are presumed to be fictional.

With few exceptions, kings belong to Dál Cuinn (the Connachta and Uí Néill). Understood as a list of kings of Tara, it is not considered to be inclusive. A number of well-known kings from the Laigin, Érainn, Ulaid and Cruthin, are missing. The chief rivals of Dál Cuinn after Conn's floruit (and others for a few centuries before) were the Dáirine (usually the Corcu Loígde during Dál Cuinn's era), two or three of whom are listed, but whose overkingdom in the south of Ireland collapsed in the 6th century. They were outmanoeuvred and replaced by the related Eóganachta, who established the Kingship of Cashel, soon to periodically rival Tara. The poem itself in its closing language probably mentions Cathal mac Finguine when young, and this can also be used to date the Baile Chuind to the late 7th or early 8th century.

Synthetic lists
The Lebor Gabála Érenn, dating to the 11th–12th century, purports to list every High King from remote antiquity to the time of Henry II's Lordship of Ireland in 1171. The High Kingship is established by the Fir Bolg, and their nine kings are succeeded by a sequence of nine kings of the Tuatha Dé Danann, most if not all of whom are considered euhemerised deities. After the Milesian (Gaelic) conquest the High Kingship is contested for centuries between the descendants of Eber Finn and Érimón, sons of Míl Espáine. The original compilation stopped at the reign of Tuathal Techtmar. The kings of the Goidelic dynasties established by Tuathal were added by other editors. Later editions of the Lebor Gabála tried to synchronise its chronology with dateable kings of Assyria, Persia, and Ptolemaic Egypt and Roman emperors.

There are a handful of sources slightly predating the Lebor Gabála Érenn covering significant portions of essentially the same list of Milesian High Kings (though following a discrepant chronology), starting with the Laud Synchronisms estimated to have been compiled  (part of Laud 610). The oldest section of the Lebor Gabála Érenn "Roll of Kings" is taken from the poems of Gilla Cómáin mac Gilla Samthainde, written .

Early Modern works like the Annals of the Four Masters and Geoffrey Keating's Foras Feasa ar Éirinn continued this tradition based on later Irish annals. Keating's chronology, based on reign lengths, is longer than the synchronised chronology of the Lebor Gabála, and the Four Masters chronology is even longer.

 LGE: synchronised dates from Lebor Gabála Érenn
 FFE: chronology based on reign lengths given in Geoffrey Keating's Forus Feasa ar Erinn.
 AFM: chronology from the Annals of the Four Masters

Fir Bolg High Kings
These kings are considered to be legendary.

Tuatha Dé Danann High Kings
These kings are considered to be legendary.

Milesian High Kings
These kings are considered to be legendary.

Goidelic High Kings
Many of these kings are considered to be legendary. Dynastic affiliations are based on the genealogies of historical dynasties who claimed them as an ancestor.

Semi-historical High Kings of Ireland
These kings are historical figures for the most part, but naming them High Kings of Ireland may be anachronistic or inaccurate in certain cases. Their dynastic affiliations are also uncertain, as some may have been posthumously added to groups they did not belong to.

Historical High Kings of Ireland
These kings can be considered genuinely historical High Kings (with or without opposition).

Later attempts at revival
Brian Ua Néill (d. 1260), as part of the mid-13th-century revolts against Anglo-Norman colonisation of Ireland
Edubard a Briuis (d. 1318), as part of the Bruce campaign in Ireland

See also
 List of Irish royal consorts
 List of kings of Ulster
 List of kings of Leinster
 List of kings of Connacht
 List of kings of Munster
 List of kings of Meath
 Lordship of Ireland
 Monarchy of Ireland

References

Further reading

High Kings of Ireland
 
Ireland, High Kings